Rahimabad (also Romanized as Raḩīmābād) is a village in Mian Jam Rural District, in the Central District of Torbat-e Jam County, Razavi Khorasan Province, Iran. At the 2006 census, its population was 466, in 95 families.

References 

Populated places in Torbat-e Jam County